63rd Street station is a commuter rail station within the city of Chicago that serves the Metra Electric Line north to Millennium Station and south to University Park, Blue Island, and the Chicago neighborhood of South Chicago and the South Shore Line to Gary and South Bend, Indiana. Most South Shore Line trains do not stop at this station, except for one inbound train during the AM rush and two outbound trains during the PM rush on weekdays. As of 2018, the station is the 169th busiest of Metra's 236 non-downtown stations, with an average of 167 weekday boardings.

History
The station, originally named Woodlawn, was built by the Illinois Central Railroad (ICRR) in 1903, and served both ICRR commuter trains and long-distance passenger trains until the railroad relinquished its passenger train service to Amtrak in 1971. A large combination station and office building for the Illinois Central was built in 1917, and demolished in the 1980s. The station had another island platform between the two non-electrified tracks on the eastern side to serve Illinois Central and some New York Central long-distance trains. It is now removed, but evidence still remains.

Named trains making stops at Woodlawn:
Illinois Central:
City of New Orleans (to New Orleans)
Green Diamond (to St. Louis)
Louisiane (to New Orleans)
Panama Limited (to New Orleans)
Seminole (to Jacksonville, Florida)
New York Central:
Cincinnati Special (to Cincinnati)
James Whitcomb Riley (to Cincinnati)

Recent years
This also serves as a stop for Mount Carmel High School students, which is directly across from the station. The station was originally used as a local and express station until the schedules were shifted in 1975 to make 55th–56th–57th Street station the express station.

This is the last stop on the main line for trains of the South Chicago branch, which splits off south of the station. Prior to 1982, the Jackson Park branch of the South Side 'L' crossed the Metra Electric tracks on a bridge just north of this station. Trains stopped at nearby Dorchester station.

Bus connections
CTA
  63 63rd (Owl Service)

References

External links 
 
 
 South Shore Line - Stations

Former Illinois Central Railroad stations
Metra stations in Chicago
South Shore Line stations in Illinois
Railway stations in the United States opened in 1903
Former Michigan Central Railroad stations
Former New York Central Railroad stations
Former Chesapeake and Ohio Railway stations